NGC 94 (PGC 1423) is a lenticular galaxy in the constellation Andromeda. It was discovered by Guillaume Bigourdan in 1884. This object is extremely faint and small. A little above the galaxy is NGC 96. NGC 94 is about 260 million light-years away and 50,000 light-years across.

References

0094
?
01423
Discoveries by Guillaume Bigourdan
Andromeda (constellation)
Lenticular galaxies